Brooks Ashmanskas (born June 14, 1969) is an American actor. He has appeared both on Broadway and Off-Broadway as well as in regional theatres. Ashmanskas has done limited film and television work, most recently appearing in the Netflix series Uncoupled. He was nominated for a 2006 Tony Award for Best Performance by a Featured Actor in a Musical and a Drama Desk Award Outstanding Featured Actor in a Musical for playing various characters in Martin Short: Fame Becomes Me, and for a 2019 Tony Award for Best Performance by an Actor in a Leading Role in a Musical for his role as Barry Glickman in The Prom.

Early life
Ashmanskas is originally from Salem, Oregon, but grew up in Beaverton, just outside of Portland. He graduated from Bennington College. He is openly gay.

Career

Off-Broadway and Broadway
Ashmanskas was in the original productions of Dream (1997), Songs for a New World (Off-Broadway, 1995) and the Broadway revival of Gypsy: A Musical Fable (2003). He was a replacement "Carmen Ghia", starting in 2004, in The Producers, occasionally acting opposite original Carmen Ghia actor Roger Bart as Leo Bloom.

In 2006, he played several characters in the Broadway production of Martin Short: Fame Becomes Me, for which he received a Tony Award nomination, Best Performance By a Featured Actor in a Musical.

He appeared in the Broadway revival of The Ritz as Chris in 2007. He played the character of Mr. Dobitch in the 2010 Broadway revival of Promises, Promises. Also in 2010 he appeared in the Broadway revival of Present Laughter. He starred as the title character Off-Broadway in the New Group production of Clive at the Acorn Theatre in January 2013 through March 2013.

Ashmanskas appeared in the stage musical adaption of Bullets Over Broadway, which opened on Broadway in April 2014. In March 2015 he appeared in Something Rotten! on Broadway. In 2016, he appeared in Shuffle Along, or, the Making of the Musical Sensation of 1921 and All That Followed.

He starred as Barry Glickman in the original Broadway production of The Prom, which opened in October 2018 at the Longacre Theatre, for which he was nominated for a 2019 Tony Award for Best Performance by an Actor in a Leading Role in a Musical.

Regional theatre
He appeared in the Arena Stage production of Animal Crackers in 1999.
 
He has performed at the Huntington Theatre Company, Boston, in Present Laughter in 2007 and in She Loves Me in May and June 2008 (which transferred to the Williamstown Theatre Festival in June and July). He appeared in God of Carnage in 2012 as Alan. His appearances at the Williamstown Theatre Festival, Williamstown, Massachusetts, include She Loves Me in 2008,Knickerbocker in 2009 and
in July and August 2013 in a new musical, Johnny Baseball.

In 2008, he participated in a staged concert presentation of "Broadway: Three Generations" at the Kennedy Center, appearing in Girl Crazy and Bye Bye Birdie. He performed in Burn This as "Larry" at the Mark Taper Forum, Los Angeles, in 2011.

He appeared in the musical 1776 as John Adams at the Ford's Theatre, Washington, D.C., in 2012.

Credits

Theatre

Film

Television

Awards and nominations

References

External links
 
Brooks Ashmankas Internet Off-Broadway Database
 

1969 births
American male musical theatre actors
Living people
Bennington College alumni
American gay actors